Dianeura is a genus of moths in the Anomoeotidae family.

Species
Dianeura goochii Butler, 1888
Dianeura jacksoni Butler, 1888

Anomoeotidae
Zygaenoidea genera